Tillandsia pseudobaileyi is a species of flowering plant in the genus Tillandsia. This species is native to Mexico, Guatemala, El Salvador, Honduras, and Nicaragua.

Two varieties are recognized:

Tillandsia pseudobaileyi subsp. pseudobaileyi - Central America; Mexico from Chiapas north to Veracruz and Nayarit
Tillandsia pseudobaileyi subsp. yucatanensis I.Ramírez - Yucatán Peninsula

Cultivars
 Tillandsia 'Gorgon'
 Tillandsia 'Long John'
 Tillandsia 'Mark Goddard'
 Tillandsia 'Pink Chiffon'

References

pseudobaileyi
Flora of Mexico
Flora of Central America
Plants described in 1984